Franz Schmidberger  (born 19 October 1946) is a priest of the Society of St. Pius X, founded by Archbishop Marcel Lefebvre.

Biography
Graduated in 1972 in the university of Munich, in the same year he entered the seminary of Écône where he was ordained priest on 8 December 1975. Later he taught in the seminary of Weissbad, the first German speaking seminary of the Society.

In 1978 he founded the seminary of Zaitzkofen in Germany, where he was appointed district superior from 1979.

In 1982 Schmidberger was appointed superior general of the society of St Pius X (quitting the post of district superior). In 1994, he was succeeded by Bishop Bernard Fellay. He subsequently served as 1st General Assistant (1994-2006), Austrian (1996-2000) and again German (2006-2013) district superior as well as regent of the Zaitzkofen seminary (2003-2005 and since 2013).

With Fellay, he is said to be part of a faction that favours reconciliation with Rome on the basis of the Campos precedent, a program which is reportedly opposed by the other bishops of the SSPX.

In a letter that he addressed to the Catholic bishops of Germany in October 2008, Schmidberger rejected the description that Pope John Paul II had applied to the Jews: "our older brothers in the faith", and declared that "for as long as they do not distance themselves from their forefathers' guilt through the avowal of Christ's divinity and baptism, they are complicit in the deicide".

Notes

1946 births
Living people
People from Riedlingen
German traditionalist Catholics
Traditionalist Catholic priests
Members of the Society of Saint Pius X
20th-century Roman Catholics
21st-century Roman Catholics